The 2004–05 Macedonian Football Cup was the 13th season of Macedonia's football knockout competition. FK Sloga Jugomagnat were the defending champions, having won their third title. The 2004–05 champions were FK Bashkimi who won their first title.

Competition calendar

First round
Matches were played on 1 August 2004.

|colspan="3" style="background-color:#97DEFF" align=center|1 August 2004

|}

Second round
The first legs were played on 22 September and second were played on 27 October 2004.

|}

Quarter-finals
The first legs were played on 1 December 2004 and second were played on 22 March 2005.

|}

Semi-finals
The first legs were played on 6 April and the second on 4 May 2005.

Summary

|}

Matches

Bashkimi won 2–1 on aggregate.

Madjari Solidarnost won 1–0 on aggregate.

Final

See also
2004–05 Macedonian First Football League
2004–05 Macedonian Second Football League

External links
 2004–05 Macedonian Football Cup at rsssf.org
 2004–05 Macedonian Football Cup at FFM.mk

Macedonia
Cup
Macedonian Football Cup seasons